Priory: The Only Home I've Got is a Canadian short documentary film, directed by Mark Dolgoy and released in 1978. The film is a portrait of the Priory Hospital in Victoria, British Columbia, a long-term care facility organized around the then-new model of independent living.

The film won the Genie Award for Best Documentary Under 30 Minutes at the 1st Genie Awards in 1980.

References

External links

Watch Priory: The Only Home I've Got at the National Film Board of Canada

1978 films
Canadian short documentary films
Best Short Documentary Film Genie and Canadian Screen Award winners
National Film Board of Canada documentaries
1980s English-language films
1970s English-language films
1980s Canadian films
1970s Canadian films